Mike IX Williams (born Michael D. Williams) is an American vocalist and songwriter, best known as the lead singer of New Orleans-based sludge metal band Eyehategod. He is the former associate editor of heavy metal magazine Metal Maniacs and has also worked on other projects.

Early life
Williams  was born in High Point, North Carolina. His parents died when he was a child. At the age of 15, he left home. During most part of his life he has lived in New Orleans, Louisiana but he also lived some time in New York City.

Eyehategod

Williams was invited to join Eyehategod by Jimmy Bower in 1988. Since then, all of the band's albums have featured his vocals which have been described as "tortured laryngitis screams", an "indecipherable ranting", and "the utmost sickening, puke-ridden audio atrocities that could actually prove deadly if taken in large doses".

For the recording of Dopesick, Eyehategod's third album, Williams went through several issues. At the time, he was living in Clinton Hill, Brooklyn in New York City so he had to travel between there and New Orleans, Louisiana frequently for the recording sessions, which took place at Side One Studios. He attempted to record the sound of smashing glass for the introduction to the album, by smashing a bottle on the floor of the studio. In the process, Williams slashed his hand open badly and bled all over the studio floor. One of the band members then apparently smeared the words "Hell" and "Death to Pigs" in his blood. The studio owner reportedly called Century Media to ask if the band were insane, and threatened to kick them out because of this.

Role in the band
The band's lyrics and themes are completely conceived by Williams. He always has lyrics written by him ready so when the other members of the band send him songs he just decides which lyrics he wants for each song. His lyrics never try to portray anything, they never have a story attached to them. Sometimes he works with the musical atmosphere created by his partners in Eyehategod.

Other projects
During his first years as an Eyehategod member, Williams was in two other bands: Drip, a sludge metal band, which also featured fellow Eyehategod band members Jimmy Bower and Brian Patton, and Crawlspace.

In 2006, he began a hardcore punk band along with Phil Anselmo named Arson Anthem. He's the band's singer. Williams stated in 2008 that his desire with this band is that it makes people explore early hardcore punk, what he listened to when he had no responsibility and used to ride on his skateboard.

Along with all Eyehategod members except Jimmy Bower, Williams formed Outlaw Order, another sludge metal band, where he provides vocals for the band.

In 2005, Williams' first book, Cancer as a Social Activity, was released. The book includes old lyrics and portions of collages that Williams assembled for Eyehategod which date back as far as 1988 as well as unreleased stuff, written during the period of two or three years before the release of the book. The book also shows Eyehategod's history. It was mostly written in New Orleans and New York City but there are also part which were written while he was traveling.

Early 2013 saw the emergence of Corrections House, an industrial project involving Williams plus members of Neurosis, Nachtmystium, and Yakuza.

In 2004, Williams and longtime friend Seth Putnam of the band Anal Cunt had plans to start a band and write a record consisting of all anti-cop songs. It is currently unknown if any material was written or recorded.

Hurricane Katrina and jail
When Hurricane Katrina hit New Orleans on August 29, 2005, Williams was at his home in the Lower Garden District with his then-girlfriend. About eight hours after the beginning of the storm, the power went out. By listening to battery powered radio announcements they were able to find out that the situation in New Orleans was quite bad. After the hurricane passed, the water in Williams' neighborhood subsided. At this time, violence and crime in the area became rampant and the police were not in a position to help the residents.

In the 2020 book Raising Hell: Backstage Tales from the Lives of Metal Legends, Williams stated he looted a pharmacy after the hurricane and "didn't get busted until three days later".

Inside the house they could hear gunshots and at one time, upon leaving the apartment, Williams' partner was confronted by a person who attempted to rob her. Williams intervened on her behalf. In order to escape the violence, Williams and his partner slept at the apartment of a friend. The following morning they borrowed a car and traveled to Morgan City, Louisiana, where Williams received word that his house had burned down.

They booked a hotel room in Morgan City. Apparently, the person who attended them could see they were from New Orleans because they had to show their identity document; for unknown reasons this person contacted the police. Members of the police entered Williams's room and arrested him.

Williams was convicted of drug possession and jailed. Bail was set at $150,000; an amount Williams was unable to afford. With help from his lawyer, Williams filed for a bond reduction which was rejected by the court on the grounds that Williams was a threat to society. Williams was anxious at this time as his friends and associates were unaware that he was in jail. A fund to help to free Williams was created and his bandmates encouraged fans to send letters to him while he was in jail. Later, Phil Anselmo paid the bail money to have Williams released. Upon his release, Williams spent several months staying at Anselmo's home.

Personal life
Williams suffers from chronic asthma.

He used to be the associate editor of Metal Maniacs.

Drug addiction
Williams struggled with drug addiction before Hurricane Katrina. By the time the hurricane hit, he had stopped using heroin and was in a methadone program. During his stay in jail he did not receive the substance so he couldn't sleep for about seven days. He hardly ate for six days; he just soaked the bread from lunch in water and swallowed it because he knew he needed to keep something down. After this, he was able to break his addiction to opiates. Jimmy Bower stated in an interview that Williams inspired him to also kick opiates.

Although he no longer uses opiates, he has a long history of alcoholism that still persists to this day–his excess drinking eventually led to health problems which resulted in him requiring a liver transplant. In 2016 Williams' wife set up a crowdfund so fans could help pay for the transplant expenses. In late 2016 the funding goal was reached and Williams successfully underwent the surgery in December.

References

External links

American heavy metal singers
American male singers
Living people
Musicians from New Orleans
People from High Point, North Carolina
1968 births
American male poets
Singers from Louisiana
21st-century American poets
People from Clinton Hill, Brooklyn
American people convicted of drug offenses
21st-century American male writers